The 1941 La Flèche Wallonne was the fifth edition of La Flèche Wallonne cycle race and was held on 13 July 1941. The race started in Mons and finished in Rocourt. The race was won by Sylvain Grysolle.

General classification

References

1941 in road cycling
1941
1941 in Belgian sport